Death Knocks Twice ), is a 1969 Italian-German detective film directed by Harald Philipp and starring Dean Reed, Fabio Testi and Adolfo Celi. It also starred Anita Ekberg, Helene Chanel and Femi Benussi. It was also released as Blonde Bait for the Murderer and The Blonde Connection.

Plot
A wealthy businessman, Francesco Villaverde, who suffers from mental issues, strangles Mrs. Ferretti (Anita Ekberg), the beautiful wife of another businessman, on a beach after they make love. The murder is witnessed by two criminals who then blackmail Francesco's wife to get some property they desire from her. Two private eyes try to prove that Francesco murdered the woman on the beach, so they use a young blonde (the daughter of one of the detectives) to pose as bait for Francesco to kill.

Cast
 Dean Reed as Bob Martin
 Fabio Testi as Francisco di Villaverde
 Ini Assmann as Ellen Kent
 Leon Askin as Pepe Mangano
 Werner Peters as Charly Hollmann
 Nadja Tiller as Maria di Villaverde
 Anita Ekberg as Sophia Perretti
 Adolfo Celi as Perretti, aka Max Spiegler
 Riccardo Garrone as Amato Locatelli
 Mario Brega as Riccardo
 Hélène Chanel as Angela 
 Femi Benussi as Mabel Simmons
 Renato Baldini as Mr. Simmons
 Tom Felleghy as Berry

References

External links

1969 films
1960s thriller films
German thriller films
Giallo films
West German films
1960s German-language films
Films directed by Harald Philipp
German detective films
Italian detective films
Films set in Italy
Films based on German novels
Films based on mystery novels
Films scored by Piero Umiliani
1960s Italian films
1960s German films